WDSW-LP is a 
radio station broadcasting an Adult Album Alternative, Roots, Blues, and Classic Rock format.  WDSW-LP licensed to Cleveland, Mississippi and Cleveland, Renova, and Boyle in Mississippi.  WDSW-LP is owned and operated by Delta State University.  It broadcasts from the Nowell Student Union Building on the third floor.

History
WDSW-LP signed on as Delta State Radio in 2015 through a combination of donations, fundraising along with community and University support.  The station's mission at the time was to serve the diversity of our communities by being an inclusive outlet for all the voices in the Delta.

Programming during these early years included a block format which catered to mostly pop, adult hits, some alternative with occasional live programming provided by student, university and community members along with Delta State President William LaForge.  There was also a short stint with a country format along with religious content.

"88.1 WDSW The Trail, A Broadcast Service Of Delta State University"
WDSW-LP's mission changed in 2019 with the vision to integrate the station into Delta State's academic mission, thus reframing WDSW-LP as a learning lab for students as part of a broadcast curriculum. WDSW-LP ceased the majority of block programming in December 2019 with the removal of the 10pm - 5am jazz block and instituted an adult album alternative/roots/blues/select Southern-leaning classic rock format 24/7 to provide Cleveland and the surrounding communities with a format that is unserved by other broadcasters in the Delta. Select specialty programs (traditional blues, roots, Mississippi heritage showcases and student produced music and community features) are planned for the future on weekends.

WDSW-LP shifted programming slightly starting in late March 2020 with the addition of Community Information Bulletins to relay hyper-local information to the surrounding communities about how the Delta was adapting to the COVID-19 Coronavirus.

Coverage Area
WDSW-LP can be heard reliably for a 8-10 mile radius around Delta State University.  On good days, the station can be received as far north as Alligator (23 miles), Benoit (18 miles) to the southwest, Drew (12 miles) to the northeast and Doddsville (13 miles) to the southeast.

In communities such as Ruleville, Shaw and cities around the 10 mile mark distant from WDSW-LP, WDSW-LP suffers from attenuation from trees and buildings in addition to multipath due to WDSW-LP's single bay antenna being  HAAT.  Tropospheric propagation when in active phases can reduce WDSW-LP's signal coverage to 3–5 miles.

Migration To Full-Power Signal
On April 27, 2022, Delta State University was awarded a construction permit by the Federal Communications Commission to build a new 50,000 watt FM station on 89.5mhz.

References

External links
 88.1 WDSW The Trail Online
 88.1 WDSW The Trail on Facebook
 

college
2015 establishments in Mississippi
Adult album alternative radio stations in the United States
Blues radio stations
Classic rock radio stations in the United States
Radio stations established in 2015
DSW-LP
DSW-LP
DSW-LP